Sort Sol is a Danish  rock band from Copenhagen, Denmark. The band was formed in 1977 as a punk rock outfit, originally under the name Sods (stylized as SODS). The name Sort Sol was taken in the early 1980s. It translates to English as black sun and is named after a nature phenomenon particular to Denmark, where huge bird flocks gather in the sky and appear to block out the sun.

The Danish press often refers to their musical style as punk due to their origin, though nearly everything they have put out since 1980 is more reminiscent of styles such as post-punk, art-rock, gothic rock and even industrial music.

Band history

Beginnings: Sods
Sods was formed in Copenhagen, 1977. The original lineup consisted of: Steen Jørgensen (vocals), Peter Schneidermann (guitar; better known as Peter Peter), Knud Odde (bass) and Tomas Ortved (drums).

The band released their first studio album Minutes to Go in February 1979 which is considered the first Danish punk album. They went on to release Under en sort sol in 1980, a more experimental album, influenced in part by Joy Division, Pere Ubu and Television. T. S. Høeg (saxophone) entered the group for a short while in late 1980.

Renaming: Sort Sol
In 1981 the group released their first single under the name Sort Sol. The single "Marble Station" (with the b-side "Misguided") is only released in England on 4AD . In March 1981 the group played their first concert outside of Denmark. 1983 saw the release of the album Dagger & Guitar, featuring punk idol Lydia Lunch on two tracks.

In 1985 Lars Top-Galia (guitar, previously in the band ADS) joined the group, and the line-up stayed intact until 1996, when Peter Peter left due to disagreements within the band, partly owing to artistic differences.

In 1988 Sort Sol made the album Everything That Rises Must Converge which has been described as their artistic breakthrough. The album consists of 10 slowpaced tracks that rely heavily on the deep voice of Steen Jørgensen. In 1991 they made their first CD release which was Flow My Firetear. This was the first of their records reaching a broad audience.

They reached their peak popularity three years later with Glamourpuss which by 2002 had sold 122,483 copies in Denmark, more than all their previous records had sold. The Danish hit-movie Nattevagten used three tracks from Glamourpuss on the soundtrack, which contributed to the commercial breakthrough of Sort Sol in Denmark.

In 2004 Lars Top-Galia left the band and Sort Sol's future in jeopardy. Tomas Ortved releases his solo debut Sun Pistol in 2008. All members are known from various musical or art project throughout the years, which can be found listed in Jan Poulsens biography of the band.

In March 2009 rumours of a possible comeback began surfacing. On March 17, the Danish tabloid Ekstra Bladet wrote that Steen Jørgensen have been in contact with all previous Sort Sol members to arrange farewell concerts. However, two days later Lars Top-Galia denied any planned concerts, but confirmed that there have been talks with the old band members. He also said, "It is not unlikely that we could do in the future, but as I said, there are no concrete plans".

In 2011 Sort Sol reunited and toured Denmark with 50 concerts and released The Blackest Box, a collection of all their albums re-mastered and toured again from April–August 2013.
Sort Sol are back in the studio recording new material for the first time in over 11 years. With them in the studio was the american producer Randall Dunn who has recorded for bands like Sunn O)), Akron Family and Kinski. In 2017 Sort Sol released Stor langsom stjerne, which was followed by a tour in Denmark.

Internationally renowned artists who have performed and/or recorded with the group include William S. Burroughs, Lydia Lunch, Link Wray, The Jordanaires, Sune Rose Wagner (of The Raveonettes), Sissel Kyrkjebø and Chelsea Wolfe.

Band members 
Current members
Steen Jørgensen – vocals (1977–present)
Tomas Ortved – drums (1977–present)
Lars Top-Galia – guitar (1985–2004, 2010–present)

Former members
Knud Odde – bass (1977–2001)
Peter Peter (Peter Schneidermann)– guitar (1977–1995)
Morten Versner - violin (1980–1982)

Discography

Studio albums and EPs

Compilation albums

Box sets
Black Box (1997)
The Blackest Box (2011)

Discography (members)
Steen Jørgensen
Ginman/Jørgensen (Steen Jørgensen & Lennart Ginman) (1998)
Snedronningen (Steen Jørgensen & Lennart Ginman) (2000)
Standards for Living... (2013)

Tomas Ortved
Sun Pistol  (2008)
Catch  (2012)

References

Sources

External links
Blog page about Sort Sol when they were called Sods and played punk rock. The page includes photos, music and video from the beginning of the band's career. 
Sort Sol fan site 

Danish punk rock groups
Danish gothic rock groups
4AD artists
Musical groups established in 1977
Danish post-punk music groups